This is a complete List of National Historic Landmarks in Hawaii. The United States National Historic Landmark program is operated under the auspices of the National Park Service, and recognizes structures, districts, objects, and similar resources according to a list of criteria of national significance. The state of Hawaii is home to 33 of these landmarks, many of which relate the state's role in World War II and the archaeological remains of ancient Hawaiians, among other stories.
The table below lists all 33 of these sites, along with added detail and description.  They are distributed across six of the Hawaiian islands, with the greatest number (16) on Oahu.

Current NHLs

|}

Historical National Park Service Areas in Hawaii
In addition, or perhaps overlapping, are five U.S. National Park Service areas of historic orientation in Hawaii.  
Of these, the USS Arizona Memorial, Kaloko-Honokohau National Historical Park, Kalaupapa National Historical Park, and Puukohola Heiau National Historic Site are also National Historic Landmarks and are listed above.  The other one, which is also a landmark of national historic importance, is Pu'uhonua o Honaunau National Historical Park.  It was established in 1955, before the National Historic Landmarks program started.

See also
List of U.S. National Historic Landmarks by state
National Register of Historic Places listings in Hawaii
Historic preservation
National Register of Historic Places
History of Hawaii

References

External links

National Historic Landmark Program at the National Park Service
Lists of National Historic Landmarks

Hawaii
 
National Historic Landmarks
National Historic Landmarks